Gymnoscelis rubricata is a moth of the family Geometridae. It was described by Joseph de Joannis in 1932. This moth is endemic to Mauritius and Réunion, where it is widespread at low and medium elevations.

See also
List of moths of Réunion
List of moths of Mauritius

References

rubricata
Moths described in 1932
Moths of Mauritius
Moths of Réunion